The R556 is a Regional Route in South Africa that connects Sun City with Modderspruit.

Route
Its north-western terminus is in Sun City, North West from where the road is designated the R565 and abruptly changes direction, heading south to Rustenburg. It passes the southern entrance of the Pilanesberg National Park and then crosses the R510 before crossing the N4 at Modderspruit. It ends shortly thereafter at a junction with the R104, which goes to Rustenburg in the west and Hartbeespoort in the east.

References

Regional Routes in North West (South African province)